The JM Eagle LA Championship is a women's professional golf tournament in California on the LPGA Tour. The inaugural event in 2022 was played at Palos Verdes Golf Club in Palos Verdes Estates, concluding May 1. In 2023, it moves to Wilshire Country Club in Los Angeles, with a new title name, dates played, and doubles the purse.

Tournament names
2022: Palos Verdes Championship
2023: JM Eagle LA Championship

Winners

Tournament records

References

External links

Coverage on the LPGA Tour's official site

LPGA Tour events
Golf in Los Angeles 
Recurring sporting events established in 2022
2022 establishments in California
Women's sports in California